Santiago Raymonda (born 3 April 1979) is an Argentine football midfielder currently playing for Talleres Córdoba in the Torneo Federal A. His move to Arsenal de Sarandí in the 2006-2007 season helped the club to qualify for the Copa Libertadores for the first time in their history.

Club career
Raymonda started his career in the Argentina 2nd Division with Central Córdoba in 2001. In 2002, he joined Quilmes Atlético Club and in 2003 he moved to Instituto de Córdoba where he helped the club to win the Apertura 2003 tournament and promotion to the Primera División. During the 2004-2005 season he helped Instituto to maintain their place in the top flight.

In 2005, Raymonda moved to Arsenal de Sarandí and in the 2006-2007 season where he helped the club to qualify for the Copa Libertadores for the first time in their history. In, 2007 he was part of the Arsenal squad that won the 2007 Copa Sudamericana, which was the first major championship in the history of the club.

Following his success with Arsenal he spent a season with Mexican side CD Veracruz and in 2008 he returned to Argentina to play for Banfield

In 2009, he was signed by new Argentinos Juniors manager Claudio Borghi and he was part of the squad that won the 2010 Clausura championship. He played in 9 of the club's 19 games during their championship winning campaign, scoring 1 goal. Following that tournament, Raymonda joined recently promoted Quilmes.

Honours
Instituto
Primera B Nacional (1): Apertura 2003

Arsenal de Sarandí
Copa Sudamericana (1): 2007

Argentinos Juniors
 Argentine Primera División (1): 2010 Clausura

References

External links
 Argentine Primera statistics 
 Santiago Raymonda at Football Lineups
 

1979 births
Living people
People from Caseros Department
Argentine footballers
Argentine expatriate footballers
Association football midfielders
Argentinos Juniors footballers
Arsenal de Sarandí footballers
Central Córdoba de Rosario footballers
Quilmes Atlético Club footballers
Instituto footballers
Club Atlético Banfield footballers
C.D. Veracruz footballers
Chacarita Juniors footballers
Oriente Petrolero players
Talleres de Córdoba footballers
Argentine Primera División players
Liga MX players
Expatriate footballers in Mexico
Expatriate footballers in Bolivia
Sportspeople from Santa Fe Province